CL-35 or CL35 may refer to:

  (CL-35), a United States Navy heavy cruiser
 Chlorine-35 (Cl-35 or 35Cl), an isotope of chlorine